Intikancha (Quechua inti sun, kancha enclosure, enclosed place, yard, a frame, or wall that encloses, "sun yard", Hispanicized spelling Inticancha) is a mountain in the Andes of Peru, about  high. It is situated in the Apurímac Region, Grau Province, in the south of the Progreso District.

References

Mountains of Peru
Mountains of Apurímac Region